Ashford is an unincorporated community located in the town of Ashford, Fond du Lac County, Wisconsin, United States.

Notes

Unincorporated communities in Fond du Lac County, Wisconsin
Unincorporated communities in Wisconsin